Hammers is the plural of hammer. It may also refer to:

People with the surname
 Alwin Hammers (born 1942), German theologian and professor

Sports
West Ham Hammers, British speedway team
Lakeside Hammers, British speedway team
Herzliya Hammers, Israeli amateur American football team
Hammers, nickname for played from West Ham United F.C.

Other
Pythagorean hammers, blacksmith's hammers associated with discovery of consonance

See also
Hammer (disambiguation)